The 2018 Miami Open presented by Itaú (also known as 2018 Miami Masters) was a professional men and women's tennis tournament played on outdoor hard courts. It was the 34th edition of the Miami Open, and part of the Masters 1000 category on the 2018 ATP World Tour, and of the Premier Mandatory category on the 2018 WTA Tour. All men and women's events took place at the Tennis Center at Crandon Park in Key Biscayne, Florida, United States, from March 19 through April 1, 2018. It was the last time the tournament was played at the Tennis Center at Crandon Park. The tournament moved to the Hard Rock Stadium starting in 2019.

Points and prize money

Point distribution

 Players with byes receive first round points.

Prize money

ATP singles main-draw entrants

Seeds

The following are the seeded players. Rankings and seedings are based on ATP rankings as of March 19, 2018.

† The player did not qualify for the tournament in 2017. Accordingly, points for his 18th best result are deducted instead.
‡ The player used an exemption to skip the tournament in 2017. Accordingly, points for his 18th best result are deducted instead.

Withdrawals
The following players would have been seeded, but they withdrew from the event.

† Ramos Viñolas is entitled to use an exemption to skip the tournament and substitute his 18th best result (45 points) in its stead. Accordingly, his points after the tournament will remain unchanged.

Other entrants
The following players received wildcards into the singles main draw:
  Marcos Baghdatis
  Christopher Eubanks
  Miomir Kecmanović
  Nicola Kuhn
  Mikael Ymer

The following players received entry using a protected ranking:
  Yoshihito Nishioka

The following players received entry from the qualifying draw:
  Ričardas Berankis
  Yuki Bhambri
  Liam Broady
  Alex de Minaur
  Rogério Dutra Silva
  Bjorn Fratangelo
  Calvin Hemery
  Darian King
  Thanasi Kokkinakis
  John Millman
  Michael Mmoh
  Cameron Norrie

The following player received entry as lucky loser:
  Mirza Bašić

Withdrawals
Before the tournament
 Julien Benneteau → replaced by  Ivo Karlović
 Pablo Cuevas → replaced by  Frances Tiafoe
 Federico Delbonis → replaced by  Mirza Bašić
 Alexandr Dolgopolov → replaced by  Radu Albot
 Philipp Kohlschreiber → replaced by  Lukáš Lacko
 Paolo Lorenzi → replaced by  Jérémy Chardy
 Florian Mayer → replaced by  Vasek Pospisil
 Gaël Monfils → replaced by  Nicolás Jarry
 Andy Murray (hip surgery) → replaced by  Thomas Fabbiano
 Rafael Nadal (psoas muscle injury) → replaced by  Maximilian Marterer
 Lucas Pouille → replaced by  Víctor Estrella Burgos
 Albert Ramos Viñolas → replaced by  Mikhail Youzhny
 Andreas Seppi → replaced by  Nicolás Kicker
 Dominic Thiem (ankle injury) → replaced by  Marius Copil
 Jo-Wilfried Tsonga → replaced by  Dušan Lajović
 Stan Wawrinka → replaced by  Taylor Fritz

Retirements

ATP doubles main-draw entrants

Seeds

1 Rankings as of March 19, 2018.

Other entrants
The following pairs received wildcards into the doubles main draw:
  Marcelo Demoliner /  Daniel Nestor
  Nick Kyrgios /  Matt Reid

WTA singles main-draw entrants

Seeds
The following are the seeded players. Seedings are based on WTA rankings as of March 5, 2018. Rankings and points before are as of March 19, 2018.

† The player did not qualify for the tournament in 2017. Accordingly, points for her 16th best result are deducted instead.

Other entrants
The following players received wildcards into the singles main draw:
  Amanda Anisimova
  Victoria Azarenka
  Claire Liu
  Bethanie Mattek-Sands
  Whitney Osuigwe
  Bernarda Pera
  Ajla Tomljanović
  Serena Williams

The following players received entry from the qualifying draw:
  Katie Boulter
  Danielle Collins
  Viktorija Golubic
  Polona Hercog
  Sofia Kenin
  Monica Niculescu
  Rebecca Peterson
  Andrea Petkovic
  Alison Riske
  Natalia Vikhlyantseva
  Stefanie Vögele
  Wang Yafan

The following player received entry as a lucky loser:
  Océane Dodin

Withdrawals
Before the tournament
  Belinda Bencic → replaced by  Océane Dodin
  Dominika Cibulková → replaced by  Lara Arruabarrena
  Margarita Gasparyan → replaced by  Madison Brengle
  Kateryna Kozlova → replaced by  Verónica Cepede Royg
  Ana Konjuh → replaced by  Kateryna Bondarenko
  Mirjana Lučić-Baroni → replaced by  Yulia Putintseva
  Peng Shuai → replaced by  Alison Van Uytvanck
  Lucie Šafářová → replaced by  Johanna Larsson
  Maria Sharapova → replaced by  Jennifer Brady
  Laura Siegemund → replaced by  Kristýna Plíšková
During the tournament
  Amanda Anisimova

Retirements
  Zarina Diyas
  Kaia Kanepi
  Madison Keys
  Monica Niculescu

WTA doubles main-draw entrants

Seeds 

1 Rankings as of March 5, 2018.

Other entrants
The following pairs received wildcards into the doubles main draw:
  Victoria Azarenka /  Aryna Sabalenka
  Eugenie Bouchard /  Sloane Stephens
  Johanna Konta /  Heather Watson

The following pair received entry as alternates:
  Tatjana Maria /  Lesia Tsurenko

Withdrawals
Before the tournament
  Daria Gavrilova /  Samantha Stosur

Champions

Men's singles

 John Isner def.  Alexander Zverev, 6–7(4–7), 6–4, 6–4

Women's singles

  Sloane Stephens def.  Jeļena Ostapenko, 7–6(7–5), 6–1

Men's doubles

 Bob Bryan /  Mike Bryan def.  Karen Khachanov /  Andrey Rublev, 4–6, 7–6(7–5), [10–4]

Women's doubles

  Ashleigh Barty /  CoCo Vandeweghe def.  Barbora Krejčíková /  Kateřina Siniaková, 6–2, 6–1

References

External links